Air Marshal Philip Oliver Sturley,  (born 9 July 1950) is a former senior commander in the Royal Air Force.

Flying career
Educated at St Ignatius' College in London and Southampton University, Sturley was commissioned in the Royal Air Force in 1972. He became Director of Air Staff Briefing and Co-ordination at the Ministry of Defence in 1990, Station Commander at RAF Cottesmore in 1992 and Secretary to the Military Committee at NATO Headquarters in 1994. He went on to be Air Officer Commanding No. 38 Group in 1998, Assistant Chief of the Air Staff in 2000 and Chief of Staff to the Air North Commander in 2003, before retiring in 2005.

Sturley served as president of the Royal Air Forces Association from May 2005 to May 2011.

References

External links
Debrett's – Air Marshal Philip Sturley
II(AC) Sqn Association Web Site – P O Sturley

1950 births
Alumni of Loughborough University
Companions of the Order of the Bath
Fellows of the Royal Aeronautical Society
Living people
Members of the Order of the British Empire
People educated at St Ignatius' College, Enfield
Recipients of the Commendation for Valuable Service in the Air
Royal Air Force air marshals